{{DISPLAYTITLE:C15H16N2O}}
The molecular formula C15H16N2O (molar mass: 240.30 g/mol, exact mass: 240.1263 u) may refer to:

 Ameltolide
 Benmoxin, or mebamoxine

Molecular formulas